Ernest Hill may refer to:

 Ernest Hill (musician) (19001964), American jazz double-bassist
 Ernest Hill (author) (19142003), English science fiction author

See also
 Ernest Friedman-Hill, principal member of the technical staff at Sandia National Laboratories
 Ernestine Hill (1899–1972), Australian journalist, travel writer and novelist
 Hill (surname)